Events in the year 1942 in Japan.

Incumbents
Emperor: Hirohito
Prime Minister: Hideki Tōjō

Governors
Aichi Prefecture: Yukisawa Chiyoji 
Akita Prefecture: Fumi 
Aomori Prefecture: Seiichi Ueda (until 9 June); Shunsuke Yamada (starting 9 June)
Ehime Prefecture: Masatomi Hatakeda (until 7 July); Ryuichi Fukumoto (starting 7 July)
Fukui Prefecture: 
 until 9 January: Kubota 
 9 January-15 June: Shigeo Miyoshi
 starting 15 June: Nagano Wakamatsu
Fukushima Prefecture: Sumio Hisakawa (until 7 July); Yoshio Araki (starting 7 July)
Gifu Prefecture: Tetsushin Sudo (until 23 May); Miyoshi Shigeo (starting 23 May)
Gunma Prefecture: Goro Murata 
Hiroshima Prefecture: Tokiji Yoshinaga (until 15 June); Saiichiro Miyamura (starting 15 June)
Ibaraki Prefecture: Kanichi Naito (until 7 October); Tsujiyama (starting 7 October)
Iwate Prefecture: Yoshifumi Yamauchi (until 15 June); Osamuzo Suzuki (starting 15 June)
Kagawa Prefecture: Osamu Eianhyaku (until 9 January); Yoshiji Kosuga (starting 9 January)
Kanagawa Prefecture: Mitsuma Matsumura (until month unknown)
Kochi Prefecture: Naoaki Hattori (until 7 July); Satoru Okino (starting 7 July)
Kumamoto Prefecture: Chioji Yukisawa (until 10 June); Hikari Akira (starting 10 June)
Kyoto Prefecture: Ando Kyoushirou 
Mie Prefecture: Yoshiro Nakano (until 7 October); Koji Soga (starting 7 October)
Miyagi Prefecture: Nobuo Hayashin (until 7 October); Otomaru Kato (starting 7 October)
Miyazaki Prefecture: Osafume Katsumi 
Nagano Prefecture: Noburo Suzuki (until 9 January); Nagoya Osamu (starting 9 January)
Niigata Prefecture: Doi Shohei 
Oita Prefecture: Ito Hisamatsu (starting 6 May)
Okinawa Prefecture: Hajime Hayakawa 
Saga Prefecture:  (until 23 May); Shogo Tanaka (starting 23 May)
Saitama Prefecture: Miyano Shozo (until 9 January); Toshio Otsu (starting 9 January)
Shiname Prefecture: Yasuo Otsubo (until 9 January); Goro Koizumi (starting 9 January)
Tochigi Prefecture: Saburo Yamagata (until 9 January); Sakurai Yasuemon (starting 9 January)
Tokyo: Jitsuzo Kawanishi (until 9 January); Matsumura Miro (starting 9 January)
Toyama Prefecture: Kingo Machimura 
Yamagata Prefecture: Hee Yamauchi (until 7 July); Akira Saito (starting 7 July)

Events 
Below, events of World War II have the "WWII" preface

 11 January – Japanese paratroopers land on Sulawesi.
 12 January –  Japan declares war on the Dutch.
 22 January – Hideki Tōjō warns Australia that "if you continue resistance, we Japanese will destroy you."
 4 February – Japan demands the surrender of Singapore.
 17 February – Singapore is renamed Shōnan ("Light of the South").
 20 March – The navy minister, Admiral Shigetarō Shimada says that in view of the Allies' "Retaliation and hatred", Japan would no longer follow recognized rules of sea warfare.
 18 April – Doolittle Raid, the first bombing raid on the Japanese home islands
 25 May – Four ships leave Hokkaido to stage a diversionary raid on the Aleutian Islands.
4–7 June – Battle of Midway
21 August – Battle of the Tenaru
11–12 October – Battle of Cape Esperance
12–15 November – Naval Battle of Guadalcanal

Births

 January 8 – Junichiro Koizumi, 56th Prime Minister of Japan
 January 27 – Tasuku Honjo, immunologist
 February 1 – Masa Saito, professional wrestler (d. 2018)
 March 29 – Kenichi Ogata, actor
 April 2 – Hiroyuki Sakai, chef
 April 25 – Katsuji Adachi, professional wrestler (d. 2010)
 May 24 – Ichirō Ozawa, politician
 July 3 – Mitsuhiro Kitta, golfer
 July 5 – Motoaki Inukai, footballer
 July 22 – Toyohiro Akiyama, astronaut
 August 31 – Isao Aoki, golfer
 September 16 – Tadamasa Goto, yakuza boss
 September 19 – Nobuo Sekine, sculptor (d. 2019)

Deaths
May 11 – Sakutarō Hagiwara, writer, poet and critic (b. 1886)
May 29 – Akiko Yosano, author and poet (b. 1878)
June 4 
Jisaku Okada, Naval officer, killed in action at the Battle of Midway (b. 1897)
Tamon Yamaguchi, admiral (b. 1892)
June 5 – Ryusaku Yanagimoto, captain (b. 1894)
August 21 – Kiyonao Ichiki (b. 1892)
August 26 – Junichi Sasai, aviator  (b. 1918)
September 5 – Toshinari Maeda, general (b. 1885)
October 12 – Aritomo Gotō, admiral (b. 1888)
October 21 – Toshio Ōta, aviator (b. 1919)
October 26 – Yumio Nasu, major general (b. 1892)
November 5 – Kiyoura Keigo, politician and Prime Minister of Japan (b. 1850)
November 23 – Tomitarō Horii, lieutenant general (b. 1890)
December 4 – Atsushi Nakajima, author (b. 1909)

See also
 List of Japanese films of the 1940s

References

 
1940s in Japan
Years of the 20th century in Japan